Martine Desjardins (born 1957) is a Canadian writer from Quebec. She is most noted for her 2005 novel L'Évocation, which was the winner of the Prix Ringuet in 2006, and her 2009 novel Maleficium, which was a Governor General's Literary Award finalist for French-language fiction at the 2010 Governor General's Awards.

Fred A. Reed and David Homel won the Governor General's Award French to English Translation at the 2001 Governor General's Awards for Fairy Ring, their translation of Desjardins' Le Cercle de Clara, and were nominated at the 2005 Governor General's Awards for All That Glitters, their translation of Desjardins' L'Élu du hasard.

Medusa, an English translation by Oana Avasilichioaei of her 2020 novel Méduse, is slated for publication in 2022.

Works
 Le Cercle de Clara, 1997
 L’Élu du hasard, 2003
 L’Évocation, 2005
 Maleficium, 2009
 La Chambre verte, 2016
 Méduse, 2020
 Le revenant de Rigaud, 2021

References

1957 births
Living people
20th-century Canadian novelists
20th-century Canadian women writers
21st-century Canadian novelists
21st-century Canadian women writers
Canadian novelists in French
Canadian women novelists
French Quebecers
Writers from Quebec